Brooks Otis (June 10, 1908 – July 26, 1977) was an American scholar of Classical languages and literature.  Born in Boston, he graduated from Harvard in 1929, took the M.A. in 1930, and received the Ph.D. in 1935. Otis taught at Hobart College from 1935 to 1957, then at American University of Beirut for one year before accepting a position at Stanford University as Professor of Classics. In 1970 he moved to the University of North Carolina at Chapel Hill where he followed T. Robert S. Broughton as George L. Paddison Professor of Latin. While at Stanford Otis was one of the founders of the Intercollegiate Center for Classical Studies in Rome, Italy, in 1965. He was a member of the Guild of Scholars of The Episcopal Church.

Otis was known for some of the most concise and penetrating critical essays written on classical literature. His first book, published at the age of 55, was Virgil: A Study in Civilized Poetry (1963), which was immediately recognized as a classic. He also wrote Ovid as an Epic Poet (1966) and the posthumous Cosmos and Tragedy: An Essay on the Meaning of Aeschylus (1981), edited with notes and a preface by E. Christian Kopff), which was part of a long manuscript left unfinished at his death, entitled "The Transcendence of Tragedy".

References

External links
 

1908 births
1977 deaths
American classical scholars
Harvard University alumni
Scholars of Latin literature
Classical scholars of the University of North Carolina at Chapel Hill
Linguists from the United States